Jeffords is a surname. Notable people with the surname include:

Elza Jeffords (1826–1885), American representative prominent resident of Mississippi following the Civil War
Harrison Jeffords (1834–1863), American colonel and hero of the American Civil War
Jim Jeffords (1934–2014), American former U.S. Senator from Vermont
Tom Jeffords (1832–1914), American United States Army scout, Indian agent, prospector, and prominent resident of the Arizona Territory

See also
Jefford